Boubacar Diallo may refer to:

 Boubacar Diallo (filmmaker), Burkinabé filmmaker and writer
 Boubacar Telli Diallo (1926–1976), Guinean Minister of Justice, magistrate and lawyer
 Boubacar Yacine Diallo (born 1955), Guinean journalist, writer and government minister
 Boubacar Diallo (footballer) (born 1985), Guinean footballer
 Boubacar Diallo (athlete) (born 1960), Senegalese sprinter